Edmund Rupert Joseph "Ed" Dermer (born 30 October 1957) in Subiaco, Western Australia is an Australian politician. He is currently the member of the Western Australian Legislative Council representing the North Metropolitan Region. Elected to Parliament in the 1996 state election after the resignation of Samuel Mathew Piantadosi he is a member of the Labor Party.

He was re-elected in the 2001 and 2005 state elections and has held the position of Government Whip in the Legislative Council from May 2001 to present.

Dermer was one of the three North Metropolitan Labor MLCs, along with Graham Giffard and Ken Travers, who proved to be critical in the introduction of Daylight saving in 2006 in Western Australia. Initially intending on voting against the motion, they all eventually decided to support the motion in line with the wishes of their electorate and party.

In 2008, Dermer was caught in a rip current with his sons, Alexander and Cameron, at a Surfers Paradise beach. Dermer and Cameron had to be rescued by lifesavers. Shortly afterward he was diagnosed with a melanoma on the back of his neck, which was removed and found to be malignant.

References

1957 births
Living people
Members of the Western Australian Legislative Council
People educated at Newman College, Perth
Politicians from Perth, Western Australia
Australian Labor Party members of the Parliament of Western Australia
21st-century Australian politicians